The 2018–19 Washington State Cougars women's basketball team represents Washington State University during the 2018–19 NCAA Division I women's basketball season. The Cougars, led by first year head coach Kamie Ethridge, play their home games at the Beasley Coliseum and were members of the Pac-12 Conference. They finished the season 9–21, 4–14 in the Pac-12 to finish in tenth place. They lost in the first round of the Pac-12 women's tournament to California.

Roster

Schedule

|-
!colspan=9 style=| Exhibition

|-
!colspan=9 style=| Non-conference regular season

|-
!colspan=9 style=| Pac-12 regular season

|-
!colspan=9 style=| Pac-12 Women's Tournament

Rankings
2018–19 NCAA Division I women's basketball rankings

See also
 2018–19 Washington State Cougars men's basketball team

References

Washington State Cougars women's basketball seasons
Washington State
Washington State
Washington State